The England cricket team toured Zimbabwe from 28 November to 5 December 2004 for a four-match One Day International (ODI) series, with two matches in Harare and two in Bulawayo. England won all four matches. Foreign journalists were originally banned from covering the series, but the Zimbabwean government lifted the ban for some journalists on 25 November; however, this delay in getting accreditation for the journalists resulted in the cancellation of the first of the five planned ODIs that was due to have taken place on 26 November.

Squads
England named a 14-man squad for the tour of Zimbabwe, minus fast bowler Steve Harmison, who ruled himself out of the tour for "political and sporting reasons". Also missing from the side were opening batsman Marcus Trescothick and all-rounder Andrew Flintoff, who were rested ahead of England's tour of South Africa later in the year; Ashley Giles was also given the option to miss the tour, but he chose to travel with the team. New to the England ODI set-up were batsmen Ian Bell and Kevin Pietersen, wicket-keeper Matt Prior, and bowler Simon Jones.

ODI series

1st ODI

2nd ODI

3rd ODI

4th ODI

References

External links
England tour of Zimbabwe, 2004/05 at ESPNcricinfo

2004 in English cricket
2004 in Zimbabwean cricket
2004-05
England 2004-05
International cricket competitions in 2004–05